The Port Augusta Renewable Energy Park is a combined wind and solar farm under construction south of Port Augusta in South Australia, Australia. The solar farm is planned to be at the northern end of the site, west of the Augusta Highway and south of Sundrop Farms. The wind turbines will be on both sides of the Augusta Highway, extending south as far as the road to Horrocks Pass. Construction formally started in October 2020 and is estimated to take about 18 months to complete.

The project was developed by DP Energy, but prior to construction, Spanish company Iberdrola committed to investing  and will eventually own stage 1 after DP Energy manages its construction.

What was originally known as "Stage 1" is planned to comprise 210MW of wind generation and 107MW of solar generation. The original "Stage 2" remains owned by DP Energy and is proposed to include more solar photovoltaic generation and a grid connected battery. The developer claims that the  combination of wind, solar, battery and synchronous condensers combine to create a renewable energy power station. The former Stage 2 is now called Bluebush Solar.

The wind turbines will be supplied by Vestas and solar components supplied by Downer Group.

Iberdrola announced on 23 September 2021 that the last of the 50 wind turbines had been installed. It would be connected to the grid a few months later.

In October 2021, it was announced that the primary customer for electricity from the facility will be the Olympic Dam mine owned by BHP.

References

Wind farms in South Australia
Solar power stations in South Australia
Proposed renewable energy power stations in Australia